Ticapampa District is one of ten districts of the Recuay Province in Peru.

Geography 
The Cordillera Blanca and the Cordillera Negra traverse the district. Some of the highest mountains of the district are listed below:

See also 
 Qiruqucha

References

Districts of the Recuay Province
Districts of the Ancash Region